Holly Raser is a Democratic Party member of the Montana House of Representatives, representing District 98 since 2000. She ran for Montana State Superintendent of Public Instruction in 2008.

External links
Montana House of Representatives - Holly Raser official MT State Legislature website
Holly Raser for Superintendent of Public Instruction official campaign website
Project Vote Smart - Representative Holly Raser (MT) profile
Follow the Money - Holly Raser
2008 2006 2004 2002 2000 campaign contributions

Members of the Montana House of Representatives
Living people
Women state legislators in Montana
Year of birth missing (living people)
21st-century American women